Mandala was an American folk dance performing group based in the Boston, Massachusetts area, which presented programs of dance and music from around the world, starting in the mid-1960s.  The group's first director (1966-1968) was Robert Leibman. They performed in the Boston area, throughout the northeast, and occasionally at festivals around the world.  Their repertoire included a wide variety of ethnicities, primarily European (Bulgarian, Macedonian, Serbian, Croatian, Russian, Hungarian, Romanian, English, Scottish, Irish, etc.) plus Mexican, American, Armenian, Chinese, and more.  The group strove for authenticity in the traditions they represented.  Many of their costumes were authentic; they created others from authentic models.  In the early years they used recorded music for their performances; later they added their own orchestra.

Although stage performances were the group's primary focus, including performances at Carnegie Hall, it also participated in the 1991 movie Once Around, directed by Lasse Hallström.

In 1984 they received a National Endowment for the Arts grant "To add new choreography from North Africa and promote a self-produced home season."

References

External links 
 The Dance Heritage Coalition lists 8 choreographies and one musical medley performed by Mandala.

Dance companies in the United States
Folk dance companies
American folk musical groups
Non-profit organizations based in Massachusetts
Dance in Massachusetts